Pajetta is a surname. Notable people with the surname include:

Giancarlo Pajetta (1911–1990), Italian politician
Mariano Pajetta (1851–1923), Italian painter, brother of Pietro
Pietro Pajetta (1845–1911), Italian painter

See also
Paletta
Panetta